""It's Time to Pay the Fiddler"  is a song written by Don Wayne and Walter Haynes, and performed by American country music artist Cal Smith.  It was released in November 1974 as the first single and title track from the album It's Time to Pay the Fiddler.  The song was Smith's third and final number one on the country chart.  The single stayed at number one for a single week and spent a total of twelve weeks on the country chart.

Chart performance

Weekly charts

Year-end charts

References

1975 singles
Cal Smith songs
Songs written by Don Wayne (songwriter)
1974 songs
Songs written by Walter Haynes